Wahidi Azzan, officially the Wahidi Sultanate of Azzan, was one of four Wahidi sultanates in the area that eventually became the Aden Protectorate. It was established in 1830 and existed until May 4, 1881, when it became a part of Wahidi Balhaf.

19th-century establishments in Yemen
States and territories established in 1830
1830 establishments in Asia
States in the Aden Protectorate
Former sultanates